N.E.W.S. (Also known as North East West South) is an album by Dutch hard rock band Golden Earring, released in 1984 (see 1984 in music).

Track listing
All songs written by Hay and Kooymans.

Side one
"Clear Night Moonlight" - 3:25
"When the Lady Smiles" - 5:12
"Enough Is Enough" - 3:43
"Fist in Glove" - 3:27

Side two
"Mission Impossible" - 5:57
"I'll Make It All Up to You" - 5:22
"N.E.W.S." - 5:18
"It's Over Now" - 4:03

CD edition track listing 
"Clear Night Moonlight" – 3:23
"When the Lady Smiles" – 5:39
"Enough Is Enough" – 3:42
"Fist in Glove" – 3:25
"Orwell's Year" – 4:20
"N.E.W.S." – 5:16
"I'll Make It All up to You" – 5:22
"Mission Impossible" – 5:58
"It's Over Now" – 4:08

Personnel

Band members
Rinus Gerritsen - bass, keyboard
Barry Hay - guitar, vocals
George Kooymans - guitar, vocals
Cesar Zuiderwijk - drums

Production
Producer: Shell Schellekens
Engineer: John Kriek
Digital mastering: Greg Calbi
Horn arrangements: Cees Stolk
Concept, design and artwork: Max Crace
Photography: James N. McJunkin, Kees Tabak

Charts

Album

Singles

When the Lady Smiles

Certifications

References

Golden Earring albums
1984 albums